Omar Tarek Saiid Oraby (born 8 September 1991) is an Egyptian basketball player for Al Ahly and the Egyptian national team.

College career
Oraby played college basketball for Rice and later USC Trojans.

Professional career
Oraby started playing professionally in his home country Egypt with Gezira. He also played in the 2014 NBA Summer League with the Houston Rockets. When returning to Egypt, Oraby had to join military service. In September 2020, Oraby signed with Al Ahly.

Personal
Omar's brother, Mohamed, played handball for the Egyptian national team.

References

External links
Omar Oraby at RealGM
Omar Oraby at Afrobasket.com

1991 births
Living people
Egyptian men's basketball players
Centers (basketball)
Sportspeople from Cairo
Al Ahly basketball players
Gezira basketball players
Rice Owls men's basketball players
USC Trojans men's basketball players